Douchy-Montcorbon is a commune in the Loiret department of central France. The municipality was established on 1 January 2016 by merger of the former communes of Douchy and Montcorbon.

Notable people  
 Alain Delon, French actor and businessman, lives in Douchy a large part of the year, since 1971. 
 Mireille Darc, French model and actress, lives also in Douchy when she was Alain Delon's longtime companion.

See also 
Communes of the Loiret department

References 

Communes of Loiret